Baldwin Li (born March 1982) is an English film producer from Manchester, United Kingdom.

Li founded Honlodge Productions, his production company, in 2006.

In 2011—alongside film director Mark Gill—Li co-wrote, produced, and co-edited the BAFTA and Academy Award-nominated The Voorman Problem, starring Martin Freeman and Tom Hollander.

England is Mine, Li's first feature in collaboration with Gill, premiered at the closing gala of Edinburgh International Film Festival on 2 July 2017.

Filmography
 2008 - 25Gs 
 2011 - The Voorman Problem  
 2013 - Full Time   
 2017 - England is Mine

References

External links

Alumni of Balliol College, Oxford
English screenwriters
English male screenwriters
Living people
1982 births